Kathleen L. McGinn is an American economist currently the Cahners-Rabb Professor of Business Administration at Harvard Business School.

References

Year of birth missing (living people)
Living people
Harvard Business School faculty
American economists
Cornell University alumni
Northwestern University alumni